Plantago aristata is a species of plantain known by the common name bracted plantain or largebracted plantain. It is native to the eastern and central United States, and it can be found in other parts of North America as well as parts of Eurasia as an introduced species. It grows in many types of habitat, including disturbed areas, where it is a minor weed.

Description
It is an annual herb usually lacking a stem, producing a circular rosette of many narrow linear leaves each up to 15 centimeters long. The stemlike inflorescences grow erect to a maximum height around 30 or 35 centimeters tall. Atop the peduncle of the inflorescence is a dense spike of many small flowers each with four whitish lobes a few millimeters long. Between the flowers are long, narrow bracts which may be 3 centimeters long, the defining characteristic of the species. The bracts have fluffy hairs around their bases near the flowers.

References

External links
Jepson Manual Treatment
Missouri Plants Photo Profile
Photo gallery

aristata
Flora of North America